The 1950–51 Cypriot First Division was the 14th season of the Cypriot top-level football league.

Overview
It was contested by 8 teams, and Çetinkaya Türk S.K. won the championship.

League standings

Results

References
Cyprus - List of final tables (RSSSF)

Cypriot First Division seasons
Cypriot First Division, 1950-51
1